VPN-1 is a firewall and VPN product developed by Check Point Software Technologies Ltd.  

VPN-1 is a stateful firewall which also filters traffic by inspecting the application layer. It was the first commercially available software firewall to use stateful inspection. Later (1997), Check Point registered U.S. Patent # 5,606,668 on their security technology that, among other features, included stateful inspection. VPN-1 functionality is currently bundled within all the Check Point's perimeter security products. The product, previously known as FireWall-1, is now sold as an integrated firewall and VPN solution.

Platforms 

The VPN-1 software is installed on a separate operating system, which provides the protocol stack, file system, process scheduling and other features needed by the product. This is different from most other commercial firewall products like Cisco PIX and Juniper firewalls where the firewall software is part of a proprietary operating system.

Although traditionally sold as software only, VPN-1 is also sold in appliance form as Check Point's UTM-1 (starting 2006) and Power-1 appliances. Appliances run the Gaia, or Gaia Embedded operating system.

As of version R80, Check Point Quantum Network Security supports the following operating systems:
 Check Point Gaia Embedded (an ARM based distribution for SMB appliances);
 Check Point Gaia (a Check Point Linux distribution, based on Red Hat Enterprise Linux, unifying IPSO and SecurePlatform into a single operating system);

Previous versions of Check Point firewall supported other operating systems including Sun Solaris, HP-UX and IBM AIX, and Microsoft Windows. See the table in the Version History section below for details.

VPN-1 running on the Nokia platform on IPSO was often called a Nokia Firewall as if it were a different product, but in fact it runs the same VPN-1 software as other platforms.

Upon completing the acquisition of Nokia Security Appliance Business in 2009, Checkpoint started the project named Gaia aimed at merging two different operating systems—SecurePlatform and IPSO—into one. This new OS is positioned to finally replace both existing operating systems at some point in the future.
On April 17, 2012 Check Point announced the general availability of the Gaia operating system as part of the R75.40 release.

Features
While started as pure firewall and vpn only product, later more features were added. And while they are licensed separately, they have since began to be bundled in default installations of the VPN-1 as well.

SmartDefense (IPS) This feature adds to the built-in stateful inspection and inherent TCP/IP protocols checks and
normalization inspection of most common application protocols. Starting NGX R70 this feature has been rebranded as IPS.
Quality of service (Floodgate-1) Checkpoint implementation of the Quality of service (QOS). It supports
bandwidth  guaranteeing or limiting per QOS rule or per connection. Also the priority queuing can be done (LLQ). Nevertheless,
RFC based QOS implementation, be it Differentiated services or Ip precedence, are not supported 
Content Inspection Starting with NGX R65 this new feature has been introduced providing 2 services:
 Antivirus scanning - scanning of the passing traffic for viruses
 Web filtering - limiting access of internal to the firewall hosts to the Web resources using explicit URL specification or category rating.

See also
Check Point
Check Point Abra

References

External links 
www.checkpoint.com — Check Point Software Technologies web site
www.fw-1.de — information about VPN-1
Check Point Official Forums
CPUG: The Check Point User Group
Check Point IPsec IKE Implementation details

Computer network security